The Russian State Symphony Cinema Orchestra is an orchestra under the control of the Ministry of Culture Symphony Orchestra, performing musical compositions for use in movies and other media. Founded in November 1924, until 1991 it was known as the State Symphony Orchestra of Cinematography at the Council of Ministers of the USSR.

History
The orchestra was unofficially founded on November 1924 at the famous Moscow cinema "Ars", located on Arbat Street.

In 1924 in Ars he first time instead of the usual for that time pianist tapёra he made the orchestra. Such a change in the musical accompaniment of films became popular among the spectators. Since then, under the direction of conductor David Blok, the orchestra began to play in other theaters.

In 1930-1940's orchestra performed music for films such directors as Sergei Eisenstein, Vsevolod Pudovkin, Grigori Aleksandrov and Ivan Pyryev. Among the later films, musical party which served the orchestra – movies, The awarded "Oscar" ("War and Peace", "Dersu Uzala", "Burnt by the Sun", "Moscow Does Not Believe in Tears"), as well as modern Russian films ( "Doctor Zhivago", "Miracle", "The House number 6," "Pete on the way to heaven", "King", "12", "Admiral").

At various times over the conductor's stand was Alexander Gauk, Svetlanov, Yuri Nikolaev, Mark Ermler, Krimets Constantine, George Garanian.

In the years 1953–1963 the artistic director and director of the orchestra was Levon Atovmyan. From 1993 to the present chief conductor and artistic director of the orchestra is Sergey Skripka, People's Artist of Russia, laureate of the State Prize of the Russian Federation in the field of culture.

Notable conductors 
 Emin Khachaturian
 Sergei Skripka

References

External links 
 Russian State Symphony Cinema Orchestra

Musical groups established in 1924
Russian symphony orchestras